The Capture of Fort William and Mary took place in New Hampshire on December 14, 1774, when local Patriots from the Portsmouth area, led by John Langdon, stormed Fort William and Mary (overcoming a six-man caretaker detachment) and seized the garrison's powder, which was distributed through several towns in the colony for potential use in the looming struggle against Great Britain. On December 15, 1774, patriots led by John Sullivan again raided the fort, this time seizing numerous cannons.

The incident is significant as one of the first overt acts of the American Revolutionary War and the only battle to take place in the state of New Hampshire.

Background
As tensions increased before the American Revolutionary War, Lord North's ministry became concerned that the profusion of arms in New England would lead to bloodshed. On October 19, 1774, King George III issued a confidential Order in Council forbidding the export of arms and powder to America. Word of the order reached operatives in New England's patriot movement.

The port at Boston had been closed in punishment for the Boston Tea Party, and the Portsmouth Committee of Correspondence kept in close contact with friends of liberty in Boston. Tensions in Massachusetts nearly erupted into violence in the fall of 1774 when redcoats seized provincial gunpowder during the so-called Powder Alarm. Upon learning of the Order in Council, patriots feared that the British military would make another attempt to seize colonial stores. Patriots in Rhode Island moved munitions from the fort at Newport inland for safekeeping without incident. In Massachusetts, rumors flew that troops from Boston were headed to reinforce Fort William and Mary and seize its powder and arms. On December 13, 1774, four months before his more famous ride in Massachusetts, Paul Revere rode to Portsmouth to sound the alarm. Once he arrived in Portsmouth, Revere met with Samuel Cutts, a local merchant, and together they worked with local Patriots on a plan for the fort.

Raid 
On the morning of December 14, Patriots from the town of New Castle unsuccessfully attempted to take the gunpowder at Fort William and Mary by trickery. Meanwhile, John Langdon made his way through Portsmouth with a drummer, collecting a crowd to descend on the fort. Several hundred men responded to his call, setting out for the Castle by way of the Piscataqua River. Only one provincial officer, Captain John Cochran, and five provincial soldiers were stationed at Fort William and Mary. Despite the odds against them, they refused to capitulate to Patriot demands. When Langdon's men rushed the fort, the defenders opened fire with three cannons and a volley of musket shot. Patriots stormed the walls and Cochran's men engaged in hand-to-hand fighting before being subdued by an overwhelming number of raiders. Langdon's volunteers not only broke open the powder house and absconded with about 100 barrels of gunpowder but, to three cheers, hauled down the fort's huge British flag. Several injuries but no deaths occurred in the engagement, and Cochran and his men were released after about an hour and a half of confinement.   
 
The next day, additional rebel forces arrived in Portsmouth from across the colony, as well as from Maine. Led by John Sullivan, who was accompanied by Major Alexander Scammell, the rebels returned to the fort late on the night of December 15. The post was overrun without gunfire and muskets, military supplies and 16 cannons marked as the property of the King were removed. British authorities declared the raids—for which Sullivan later received a stipend from the Continental Congress—high treason.

Aftermath 
In response to a call for aid from Boston by British Governor John Wentworth, the armed hydrographic survey sloop Canceaux arrived to keep the peace in New Hampshire on December 17, followed by the twenty-gun frigate Scarborough on December 19, with numerous Royal Marines aboard. The Governor and his family were driven from their home in Portsmouth in the summer of 1775 and forced to take refuge in the fort, guarded by the guns of British warships. Britain finally gave up on the colony of New Hampshire in order to focus attention on the military situation in Massachusetts and abandoned the fort, removing its remaining equipment to Boston along with Governor Wentworth.

The supplies captured by Patriots in December 1774 were later used by New Hampshire's forces against the British military, including in the Siege of Boston and at the Battle of Bunker Hill. Conversely, supplies (including numerous cannon) left in the fort by Patriots following the raids were subsequently put to use by the British forces. After the British abandoned the fort in the Revolution, the Patriots probably renamed it Fort Hancock.

The plaque currently on the fort is dedicated "In commemoration of the first victory of the American Revolution. The capture, on this site of Fort William and Mary, 14–15 December 1774."

References

Bibliography

External links
 The capture of Fort William and Mary, by Charles Lathrop Parsons

American Revolutionary War
1774 in the Thirteen Colonies
History of the Thirteen Colonies
Battles and conflicts without fatalities